Mehidy Hasan Miraz (Bengali: মেহেদী হাসান মিরাজ; born: 25 October 1997) is a Bangladeshi international cricket player who plays Tests and One Day Internationals (ODIs) for the Bangladesh national team. A bowling-all-rounder, he is a right-handed batsman and a right-arm off break bowler. Over the years, Mehidy emerged as one of the most talented cricket players as he reached his career best ODI rankings later this year. In November 2018, against the West Indies, he took the best match figures for a Bangladesh bowler in a Test match. In February 2021, he scored his maiden century in Tests against the West Indies. In the same series, he became the fastest bowler for Bangladesh, in terms of matches, to take 100 wickets in Test cricket, doing so in his 24th match. As of late May 2021, he is the No. 2 ODI bowler in ICC Rankings, becoming the third Bangladeshi bowler ever to hold that position; the other two being Shakib Al Hasan and Abdur Razzak.

Early and personal life
Miraz was born in Khulna and grew up in Khalishpur of Khulna city and started playing cricket when he was 8. He went to Kashipur Cricket Academy from where he was first selected for the Under-14 national cricket tournament.

On 15 March 2019, along with several members of the Bangladesh test team, Miraz was moments from entering the Al Noor mosque in Christchurch, New Zealand when a terrorist attack began. All members of the team were "deeply affected". Miraz decided to marry his long-time fiancée Rabeya Akhter Priti on 21 March 2019 in order to overcome “the shock” of the  terror attack of New Zealand.

2016 Under-19 Cricket World Cup
In December 2015, Miraz was named as the captain of Bangladesh's squad for the 2016 Under-19 Cricket World Cup.
Despite playing as an opener in majority of his tenure in the Under-19, Under-17 and other domestic tournaments, Miraz played primarily as a lower-middle order bowling all-rounder in the tournament. Miraz managed to take his team into the semi-final but lost to the West Indies. In third place play-off, Bangladesh beat Sri Lanka by three wickets. Miraz was named Player of the tournament for his all-round performance. He scored 242 runs and took 12 wickets in all the 6 matches he played in.

Domestic career
Miraz made his first-class debut against Rajshahi Division cricket team on 16 February 2015. On his debut match, he made 51 runs (he batted in only the first innings) and took four wickets. He made his Twenty20 (T20) debut on 9 November 2016 playing for Rajshahi Kings in the 2016–17 Bangladesh Premier League.

In October 2018, Miraz was named in the squad for the Rajshahi Kings team, following the draft for the 2018–19 Bangladesh Premier League. In November 2019, he was selected to play for the Khulna Tigers in the 2019–20 Bangladesh Premier League.

He played for Chatogram Challengers in BPL 2022.

International career

Test cricket
Miraz had a dream debut series as a Test player. After the remarkable 2016 Under-19 Cricket World Cup, there was never any doubt in the team management's mind that they had found themselves an exceptional talent - in fact, in an echo of Australia's unveiling of Shane Warne on the 1993 Ashes tour.  He was expected to debut a month ago for Afghanistan ODIs but was deliberately omitted to keep him as a secret from England.

On 20 October 2016, Miraz made his Test debut against England. Even though he is an off break bowler, he opened the bowling in his maiden Test innings. Ben Duckett, another debutant in the same Test match, became his first Test wicket. In the same match, he also became the seventh and youngest Bangladeshi player to take a five-wicket haul on debut in a Test.
In his 2nd Test match, he became only the sixth bowler to take three five-for in his first two Tests and took 19 wickets in the Test series and became the 9th player overall and 1st from Bangladesh to win the Player of the series award in debut Test series.

Even though Miraz had a horrible series as a batsman, scoring only 5 runs in 4 innings at an average of 1.25, Mushfiqur Rahim lauded the performances of the 19-year-old, and insisted Miraz still had much more to offer.  He said, "Miraz is a good batsman also. He didn't show that now, but hopefully in future, he will be a great all-rounder for Bangladesh". For his sensational debut series against England, a new house from Bangladesh's prime minister Sheikh Hasina was gifted to him.

In July 2018, Miraz got his first away five wicket haul in Test cricket against West Indies in Sabina Park.

In November 2018, in the second Test against the West Indies, Miraz took the best match figures by a Bangladesh bowler in Tests, finishing with the match figures of 12–117.

On 4 February 2021, in the first Test match against the West Indies, Miraz scored his maiden century in Test cricket. He scored 103 runs before being caught out off the bowling of Rahkeem Cornwall.

One Day International
In December 2016, Miraz was named in Bangladesh's One Day International (ODI) squad for their series against New Zealand, although he did not play. In March 2017, he was added to Bangladesh's ODI squad for their series against Sri Lanka. He made his ODI debut in the first match of the series on 25 March 2017 at Rangiri Dambulla International Stadium. He took his maiden ODI wicket by dismissing Kusal Mendis for 4 runs. By the end of the match, he had picked up 2 wickets for just 43 runs in his 10 overs. He surprised everyone with his magnificent bowling. Many said, "He didn't look like a bowler bowling in his first match."
He picked 4–29 in 3rd ODI vs West Indies in 2018 and helped Bangladesh win series 2–1.

In April 2019, Miraz was named in Bangladesh's squad for the 2019 Cricket World Cup. He took 6 wickets and, at an economy rate of 5.08, was Bangladesh's most economical bowler at the tournament.

In December 2020, Miraz was added to Bangladesh's ODI squad for their series against West Indies. In the second ODI against West Indies on 22 January 2021, he took his career best ODI figure of 4-25 and helped Bangladesh win the match comprehensively. This was Bangladesh's first international series since the start of the COVID-19 pandemic and they eventually won the series 3–0. Due to excellent performances in the series, Miraz was ranked 4th in the ICC ODI bowlers ranking which is his best ranking in ODI cricket as of 28 January 2021.

In February 2022, he scored 81* against Afghanistan in Chattogram, which is the highest individual score in successful ODI chase while batting at number 8 and lower.

On 7 December 2022, Miraz scored his maiden century in an innings of 100*(83) in the second match of a bilateral series against India, ultimately playing a match-winning knock to seal the series for Bangladesh. With this, he becomes the second No.8 batter to score an ODI century, and jointly holds the record for the highest score by a No.8 batter in ODIs. He combined with Mahmudullah, who played a steady knock of 77(96), to produce a 148-run stand, thus making it Bangladesh's highest partnership against India for any wicket.

Acknowledgment 
Miraz was the leading wicket-taker for Bangladesh across all formats in the year 2022. In December 2022, he was named in the Wisden's Men's ODI Team Of The Year for 2022.

Twenty20 International
In April 2017, Miraz was named in Bangladesh's Twenty20 International (T20I) squad for their series against Sri Lanka. He made his T20I debut for Bangladesh against Sri Lanka on 6 April 2017.

In April 2018, Miraz was one of ten cricketers to be awarded a central contract by the Bangladesh Cricket Board (BCB) ahead of the 2018 season.

References

External links

1997 births
Living people
Bangladeshi cricketers
Bangladesh Test cricketers
Bangladesh One Day International cricketers
Bangladesh Twenty20 International cricketers
Cricketers who have taken five wickets on Test debut
Kala Bagan Cricket Academy cricketers
Bangladesh South Zone cricketers
People from Khulna
People from Khulna District
Khulna Division cricketers
Rajshahi Royals cricketers